Bustripping is a meta-search engine for intercity buses in the U.S. It allows travelers to compare bus companies when looking for direct line run and private charter services.

Founders 
It was founded in 2011 by Ben Silverstein. He earned a degree in Business Administration and Marketing from the College of Charleston.  Jeff Mangano, CFO/President West Coast, officially joined bustripping in 2013.

Product 

Bustripping acts as a search engine for intercity buses in the US. Users enter departing and arriving cities, and dates of travel (roundtrip or one way) and bustripping shows all the bus companies that travel that route side-by-side. Users can then filter the results based on time, price and, bus company. When users want to make a purchase, they click a 'Book Now' button which directs them the bus company's website or other third party, to complete the purchase. This process is similar to what Kayak.com does for airlines.

Bustripping gets data by partnering directly with bus companies or their affiliates, pulling the data in real time, then sorting and categorizing all information. Bustripping has coded each bus company, state, and city, to allow it to sort through data quickly.

The website launched to the public on May 22, 2013, with plans to release an iPhone mobile app. The company is currently still growing and actively seeking investors.

History 
The inspiration for bustripping came in February 2011 when Ben Silverstein (bustripping CEO) was trying to find a bus from New York City to Boston, to visit Jeff Mangano (bustripping CFO). After struggling to find a central place online to search and compare all buses side-by-side, he came up with the idea of bustripping. For the rest of 2011, and into 2012, Silverstein worked on ways to centralize all the data into one easy to use format. A beta version of bustripping launched in 2012. This site was basic, but received positive feedback from individuals and in the press.

Silverstein then attempted a failed Indiegogo project to raise money to build a better version of the site. Though the Indiegogo failed, Silverstein was able to raise funds via friends and family to build the current website and mobile app.

Bustripping pitched in Tech Crunch's NYC Pitch off in February 2013  and placed in the Top 4 in the  Startpalooza in June 2013.

References

External links 
 Main website - bustripping.com
 Angel List Page
 Crowdfunder Page
 Gust Page

Bus transportation in the United States